Roden Crater is a cinder cone type of volcanic cone from an extinct volcano, with a remaining interior volcanic crater. It is located approximately 50 miles northeast of the city of Flagstaff in northern Arizona, United States.

Art project
Artist James Turrell acquired the 400,000-year-old,  crater's land for a land art project. Turrell has since been transforming the inner cone of the crater into a massive naked-eye observatory, designed specifically for viewing and experiencing sky-light, solar, and celestial phenomena. The fleeting winter and summer solstice events will be highlighted. Kanye West filmed his 2019 movie Jesus Is King at Roden Crater.

Future
The Dia Art Foundation is continuing to advocate for the development of James Turrell's Roden Crater project in the Painted Desert in Arizona which was begun in the 1970s with Dia's support. James Turrell, who purchased the Roden Crater in 1979, had plans to open the crater for public viewing in 2011, but now has tentatively set the opening for 2024.

2015 fundraising tours
A fundraising event held daily from May 14 to 17, 2015, allowed visitors to tour Roden Crater for a cost of $6,500 to Turrell's nonprofit organization.

See also
 Land Arts of the American West
 Environmental art
 Environmental sculpture
 Site-specific art
 List of cinder cones

References

External links
 IUAV-College of Architecture: Animation of Roden Crater project
 Web site for Roden Crater
 JamesTurrell.com Roden Crater section: includes site plan, chamber photos and Celestial Event visualizer

Volcanoes of Arizona
Extinct volcanoes
Land art
Mountains of Arizona
Landforms of Coconino County, Arizona
Outdoor sculptures in Arizona
Open-air museums in Arizona
American contemporary art
Cinder cones of the United States
Works by James Turrell
Mountains of Coconino County, Arizona